The Igor Moiseyev State Academic Ensemble of Popular Dance, known in Russia as the GAANT, and alternatively known as the Moiseyev Dance Company or simply the Igor Moiseyev Ballet, is a dance troupe focusing on character dance, based in Moscow, Russia. The troupe combines traditional folk dance and classical ballet techniques to create their style of character dance. It was established in 1937 by Igor Moiseyev and is one of the most influential and acclaimed dance troupes of both Soviet and modern Russia.

In the West, the Moiseyev Ballet has been described as speaking "the nationalist idiom of folk movement". It has also been called "a symbol of Soviet bureaucracy", a "mirror of the Soviet epoch",  and "the main cultural tyrant of the [Soviet] regime". However, it has also been credited with helping encourage international cultural exchange, especially between the USA and the Soviet Union.

History
In 1936, the Soviet government asked Igor Moiseyev to organize the first "Festival of National Dance". Moiseyev was a former principal dancer and choreographer of the Bolshoi Ballet, and had an interest in ethnography and folk dance. The request led him to organize a group of dancers who could dedicate themselves to folk dance. On February 10, 1937, the Moiseyev Ballet came into existence. According to Moiseyev, the dance troupe had early difficulties: the politician Poskrebyshev promised to dissolve the ensemble, however, the ensemble had Stalin's patronage. Therefore, neither Poskrebyshev nor any other politician dared to dissolve it.

The first foreign performance of the Moiseyev Ballet occurred in 1945, in Finland. It began to tour around the world in 1955, and has toured in 60 countries, including the USA, France, Israel, the UK, Japan, and China. In 1958, impresario Sol Hurok invited the Moiseyev Ballet to perform at the old Metropolitan Opera House, marking the first time a major Soviet dance group had ever performed in the United States. They also appeared on The Ed Sullivan Show.

The dance troupe was met warmly nearly everywhere, but this was not always the case. In September 1986, tear gas was thrown at a Moiseyev Ballet performance at the Metropolitan Opera House, forcing the evacuation of 4,000 people and injuring 30. An anonymous caller purporting to be the chairman of the Jewish Defense League claimed responsibility, saying it was a protest on the behalf of Soviet Jews. However, the actual chairman at the time, Irv Rubin, denied the JDL's responsibility. The identity of the attackers has never been confirmed.

The Moiseyev Ballet continues to tour and perform to the current day. It has been praised by cultural figures such as Maya Plisetskaya, Tatyana Tarasova, and Marlene Dietrich.

References 

Ballet companies in Russia
1937 establishments in the Soviet Union
Folk dance companies
Cultural organizations based in the Soviet Union